Helopini is a tribe of darkling beetles in the family Tenebrionidae. There are at least 50 genera in Helopini.

Genera
These genera belong to the tribe Helopini:

 Accanthopus Dejean, 1821  (the Palearctic)
 Adelphinus Fairmaire & Coquerel, 1866  (the Palearctic)
 Allardius Ragusa, 1898  (the Palearctic)
 Apterotarpela Kaszab, 1954  (Indomalaya)
 Armenohelops Nabozhenko, 2002  (the Palearctic)
 Asialassus Nabozhenko & Ando, 2018  (the Palearctic and Indomalaya)
 Catomus Allard, 1876  (the Palearctic)
 Ceratopelius Antoine, 1963  (the Palearctic)
 Cylindrinotus Faldermann, 1837  (the Palearctic)
 Deretus Gahan, 1900  (tropical Africa)
 Dolphus Blanchard, 1847  (the Neotropics)
 Ectromopsis Antoine, 1949  (the Palearctic)
 Entomogonus Solier, 1848  (the Palearctic)
 Erionura Reitter, 1903  (the Palearctic)
 Erulipothydemus Pic, 1918  (Indomalaya)
 Euboeus Boieldieu, 1865  (the Palearctic)
 Eustenomacidius Nabozhenko, 2006  (the Palearctic)
 Gunarus Gozis, 1886  (the Palearctic)
 Hedyphanes Fischer von Waldheim, 1820  (the Palearctic)
 Helopidesthes Fairmaire, 1895  (tropical Africa)
 Helops Fabricius, 1775  (North America, the Neotropics, and the Palearctic)
 Idahelops Keskin & Nabozhenko, 2012  (the Palearctic)
 Italohelops Español, 1961  (the Palearctic)
 Mamorina Antoine, 1951  (the Palearctic)
 Microcatomus Pic, 1925  (tropical Africa)
 Microdocnemis Nabozhenko & Keskin, 2010  (the Palearctic)
 Nalassus Mulsant, 1854  (North America, the Palearctic, and Indomalaya)
 Nautes Pascoe, 1866  (North America and the Neotropics)
 Neohelops Dajoz, 2001  (North America)
 Nephodinus Gebien, 1943  (the Palearctic)
 Nesotes Allard, 1876  (the Palearctic)
 Nipponohelops Masumoto, Ando & Akita, 2006  (the Palearctic)
 Odocnemis Allard, 1876  (the Palearctic)
 Physohelops Schuster, 1937  (the Palearctic)
 Pseudoprobaticus Nabozhenko, 2001  (the Palearctic)
 Raiboscelis Allard, 1876  (the Palearctic)
 Reitterohelops Skopin, 1960  (the Palearctic)
 Sabularius Escalera, 1914  (the Palearctic)
 Socotraphanes Nabozhenko, 2019  (tropical Africa)
 Stenohelops Reitter, 1922  (the Palearctic)
 Stenomax Allard, 1876  (the Palearctic)
 Stygohelops Leo & Liberto, 2003  (the Palearctic)
 Tarpela Bates, 1870  (North America and the Neotropics)
 Taurohelops Keskin & Nabozhenko, 2015  (the Palearctic)
 Turkmenohelops G.S. Medvedev, 1987  (the Palearctic)
 Turkonalassus Keskin, Nabozhenko & Alpagut-Keskin, 2017  (the Palearctic)
 Xanthohelops Nabozhenko, 2006  (the Palearctic)
 Xanthomus Mulsant, 1854  (the Palearctic)
 Zophohelops Reitter, 1902  (the Palearctic)
 † Cryptohelops Nabozhenko & Kirejtshuk, 2014

References

Further reading

 
 

Tenebrioninae